Valery Fernández Estrada (born 23 November 1999), simply known as Valery, is a Spanish professional footballer who plays for Girona FC. Mainly a right winger, he can also play as a right wingback.

Club career
Born in L'Escala, Girona, Catalonia, Valery joined FC Barcelona's La Masia in 2011, after representing Girona FC and Palamós CF. Released in 2014, he returned to Girona before joining Primera Catalana side FC L'Escala, where he made his senior debut at the age of just 15.

In 2016, Valery returned to Girona and signed a new three-year contract on 28 June 2018, being also promoted to the reserves in Segunda División B. In his debut for the latter on 26 August, he scored his team's second in a 2–2 away draw against CE Sabadell FC.

Valery made his professional debut on 31 October 2018, starting in a 2–2 away draw against Deportivo Alavés, for the season's Copa del Rey. He also made his La Liga debut on 2 December, coming on as a substitute for Aleix García in a 1–1 draw at Atlético Madrid; the following day, he extended his contract until 2023.

Valery scored his first professional goal on 16 January 2019, netting his team's first in a 3–3 draw against Atleti also at the Wanda Metropolitano. In July, however, he suffered a knee injury in a pre-season friendly against Derby County, being sidelined for the most of the 2019–20 season.

References

External links
Profile at the Girona FC website

1999 births
Living people
People from Alt Empordà
Sportspeople from the Province of Girona
Spanish footballers
Footballers from Catalonia
Association football defenders
Association football wingers
La Liga players
Segunda División players
Segunda División B players
Primera Catalana players
CF Peralada players
Girona FC players